Gao Xing (born 1974) is a Chinese amateur astronomer from Ürümqi, Xinjiang, China. (Astronomers name: Gaoxing) He built Xingming Observatory (星明天文台) in 2006 and discovered Comet C/2008 C1 (Chen-Gao) on February 1, 2008 with Chen Tao from Jiangsu and Comet P/2009 L2 (Yang-Gao) on June 15, 2009 with Yang Rui from Hangzhou, Zhejiang and Comet C/2015 F5 (SWAN-Xingming) on April 4, 2015 with Guoyou Sun from Wenzhou, Zhejiang, China (...?) and hence won the Edgar Wilson Award for 2008. (He won Edgar Wilson Award unter that for 2015 3 times.)

In the night on February 26, 2009, he discovered a nova in Sagittarius in the Galaxy's central part at night with his partner Sun Guoyou from Wenzhou. Gao reported his new discovery to the International Astronomical Union on May 29 and acquired the identification. On the night of October 3, 2010, he discovered a new supernova in NGC5430 at night with his partner Sun Guoyou. He also discovered several SOHO comets and NEAT asteroids. Currently, he is working as a physics teacher at the Urumqi No.1 High School. In 2017 he was awarded the Gordon Myers Amateur Achievement Award.

See also
 Urumqi No.1 High School

References

External links
 Gao Xing's Homepage

Living people
1974 births
Discoverers of comets
Discoverers of supernovae
Discoverers of minor planets
Discoveries by Gao Xing
21st-century Chinese astronomers
Amateur astronomers
Chinese schoolteachers
People from Ürümqi
Educators from Xinjiang
Scientists from Xinjiang